Demorrio Dwain Williams (born July 6, 1980) is a former American football linebacker. He was drafted by the Atlanta Falcons in the fourth round of the 2004 NFL Draft. He played college football at Kilgore College for two years, then played at Nebraska.

He has also played for the Kansas City Chiefs and the San Diego Chargers.

College career
Williams was born in Beckville, Texas.  After high school, he signed with rural Cisco Junior College, but soon left the school. Following a year of oil field work, he decided to walk-on to Kilgore College located in the town of Kilgore, Texas. It was here that Kilgore head coach Jimmy Rieves decided to change him from a cornerback to a linebacker, and he excelled there. Williams helped lead Kilgore to an undefeated season in 2001, and a #2 national ranking. Prior to entering the NFL, Williams played for the University of Nebraska, where he completed his degree in sociology.

Professional career

Atlanta Falcons
Williams started all 16 of the Falcons' regular-season games of the 2005 NFL season, recording 132 tackles, and ranking second on his team for that statistic. He had a career-high 15 tackles in a December 12, 2005 game against the New Orleans Saints.

Kansas City Chiefs

On March 1, 2008, Williams signed a five-year contract with the Kansas City Chiefs. After 4 seasons with Chiefs, Williams was released on March 6, 2012.

San Diego Chargers
Williams signed a one-year contract with the San Diego Chargers on March 8, 2012.

References

External links
Official Website
Kansas City Chiefs bio

1980 births
Living people
People from Panola County, Texas
Players of American football from Texas
American football linebackers
Kilgore Rangers football players
Nebraska Cornhuskers football players
Atlanta Falcons players
Kansas City Chiefs players
San Diego Chargers players